In mathematics, the Denjoy–Koksma inequality, introduced by  as a combination of work of  Arnaud Denjoy and the Koksma–Hlawka inequality of Jurjen Ferdinand Koksma, is a bound for Weyl sums  of functions f of bounded variation.

Statement

Suppose that a map f from the circle T to itself has irrational rotation number α, and p/q is a rational approximation to α with p and q coprime, |α – p/q| < 1/q2. Suppose that φ is a function of bounded variation, and μ a probability measure on the circle invariant under f. Then

References

Theorems in analysis
Inequalities